Mykola Tsymbal (born 7 September 1984) is a Ukrainian professional football coach and a former player.

Career
Tsymbal started his career in his hometown playing at the Kryvbas sports school in 1999. In 2003 he debuted at professional level in the Second League for the Kryvbas's second team in a home game against FC Dnister Ovidiopol. He was not able to make the first team and at the end of 2005 was released as a free agent. After playing for couple of seasons in amateurs, in 2007 he joined another Kryvyi Rih professional club Hirnyk. After couple of seasons Tsymbal again was let go. In 2011–2016 he played in the neighboring Mykolaiv Oblast championship for Kazanka.

In 2019 Tsymbal was invited to FC Mynai to assist Vasyl Kobin in coaching. Following departure of Kobin, Tsymbal was appointed the club's manager in 2021. Appointment of Tsymbal to manage FC Mynai was connected with problems to appoint of Oleksandr Sevidov who was suspended by the UAF for five years few years ago.

References

External links
 

1984 births
Living people
Sportspeople from Kryvyi Rih
Ukrainian footballers
FC Kryvbas-2 Kryvyi Rih players
FC Dnipro Cherkasy players
FC Hirnyk Kryvyi Rih players
Ukrainian Second League players
Ukrainian football managers
Ukrainian Premier League managers
FC Mynai managers
Association football defenders